Vana-Kuuste is a village in Kambja Parish, Tartu County in eastern Estonia.

Opera singer Ivo Posti (born 1975) and writer and translator Kalju Kangur (1925–1989) were born in Vana-Kuuste.

Gallery

References

Villages in Tartu County
Kreis Dorpat